Abreis Rural District is a rural district (dehestan) in Bazman District, Iranshahr County, Sistan and Baluchestan province, Iran. At the 2006 census, its population was 1,555, in 327 families.  The rural district has 22 villages. At the 2016 census, its population had risen to 6,121.

References 

Iranshahr County
Rural Districts of Sistan and Baluchestan Province
Populated places in Iranshahr County